Metzker is a surname. Notable people with the surname include:

Evany José Metzker (died 2015), Brazilian blogger and journalist
Max Metzker (born 1960), South African-born Australian swimmer 
Ray Metzker (1931–2014), American photographer

See also
Metzner